Flight 815 may refer to

Vietnam Airlines Flight 815 crashed on 3 September 1997
the fictional Oceanic Airlines Flight 815 in Lost (TV series)#Season 1

0811